Onetangi is a settlement on the north coast of Waiheke Island in New Zealand. It has a long white-sand beach fronting onto Onetangi Bay. 

The name means "Weeping Sands" in the Māori language, and comes from a battle in 1821 during the Musket Wars. The area was subdivided for settlement in 1921.

The Museum of Waiheke opened in Onetangi in 1990. The beachfront is a popular area for holiday-makers and locals whom enjoy the temperate climate and fishing in the area. The bay also contains two restaurants; Charlie Farley’s  and Three Seven Two.

Demographics

Onetangi had a population of 1,302 at the 2018 New Zealand census, an increase of 168 people (14.8%) since the 2013 census, and an increase of 147 people (12.7%) since the 2006 census. There were 513 households, comprising 657 males and 645 females, giving a sex ratio of 1.02 males per female. The median age was 46.7 years (compared with 37.4 years nationally), with 222 people (17.1%) aged under 15 years, 156 (12.0%) aged 15 to 29, 663 (50.9%) aged 30 to 64, and 261 (20.0%) aged 65 or older.

Ethnicities were 89.6% European/Pākehā, 12.2% Māori, 3.9% Pacific peoples, 3.5% Asian, and 4.1% other ethnicities. People may identify with more than one ethnicity.

The percentage of people born overseas was 30.6, compared with 27.1% nationally.

Although some people chose not to answer the census's question about religious affiliation, 62.7% had no religion, 24.0% were Christian, 1.4% had Māori religious beliefs, 0.7% were Buddhist and 2.3% had other religions.

Of those at least 15 years old, 303 (28.1%) people had a bachelor's or higher degree, and 123 (11.4%) people had no formal qualifications. The median income was $34,000, compared with $31,800 nationally. 222 people (20.6%) earned over $70,000 compared to 17.2% nationally. The employment status of those at least 15 was that 540 (50.0%) people were employed full-time, 186 (17.2%) were part-time, and 18 (1.7%) were unemployed.

References

Bays of the Auckland Region
Populated places on Waiheke Island